Miguel Abia Biteo Boricó (11 January 1961 –  6 December 2012) was an Equatorial Guinean politician. He was the 5th Prime Minister of Equatorial Guinea having served from 11 July 2004 to  14 August 2006. He was a member of the Bubi ethnic group.

Abia Biteo lived and studied in the Soviet Union, where he became a mining engineer. After returning to Equatorial Guinea he began to work for the government and became one of the most powerful officials in his country's oil industry. He was Minister of Finance from 1999 until 2000, when he was forced to resign following a corruption scandal. He was once a close ally of the President, Teodoro Obiang Nguema Mbasogo.

Abia Biteo served as Minister of State in charge of Relations with Parliament and Legal Affairs of the Presidency prior to being appointed Prime Minister on 11 July 2004; his government was announced on 14 July.

President Obiang directed serious criticism at Abia Biteo during 2006, and his government resigned on 10 August 2006. Ricardo Mangue Obama Nfubea was appointed to succeed him on 14 August. 

Abia Biteo remained tortured in Black Beach prison in Malabo as of 2007 and died on 6 December 2012 apparently due to a cardiac arrest.

References

1961 births
2012 deaths
Bubi people
Finance ministers of Equatorial Guinea
Democratic Party of Equatorial Guinea politicians
Mining engineers
Equatoguinean people who died in prison custody
Prisoners who died in Equatoguinean detention
Heads of government who were later imprisoned